Urs von Wartburg (born 1 March 1937) is a Swiss javelin thrower. He competed at five Olympics between 1960 and 1976 with the best achievement of fifth place in 1964. He is the fourth sportsperson to compete for Switzerland at five Olympics, after middle-distance runner Paul Martin and equestrians Henri Chammartin and Gustav Fischer. After retiring from senior competitions he had a long career in the javelin at European and world masters championships.

See also
List of athletes with the most appearances at Olympic Games

References
Urs von Wartburg's profile at Sports Reference.com
Urs von Wartburg's profile at the Swiss Olympic Committee

1937 births
Living people
Swiss male javelin throwers
Athletes (track and field) at the 1960 Summer Olympics
Athletes (track and field) at the 1964 Summer Olympics
Athletes (track and field) at the 1968 Summer Olympics
Athletes (track and field) at the 1972 Summer Olympics
Athletes (track and field) at the 1976 Summer Olympics
Olympic athletes of Switzerland
People from Olten District
Sportspeople from the canton of Solothurn